Pissarro is a surname. Notable people with the name include:

 Camille Pissarro (1830–1903) French Impressionist painter

Sons of Camille:
 Félix Pissarro (1874–1897) painter, etcher and caricaturist
 Georges Henri Manzana Pissarro (1871–1961) French artist
 Lucien Pissarro (1863–1944) French painter, printmaker, and wood engraver
 Ludovic Rodo Pissarro (1878–1952) engraver
 Paul-Émile Pissarro (1884-1972) French impressionist and neo-impressionist painter

Grandchildren of Camille:
 Hugues Claude Pissarro (born 1935) French painter, son of Paul-Émile
 Orovida Camille Pissarro (1893–1968) British painter and etcher, daughter of Lucien
 Claude Bonin-Pissarro (1921–2021) French painter

Great-grandchildren of Camille:
 Joachim Pissarro (born 1959) art historian
 Frédéric Bonin-Pissarro (born 1964) French painter

See also
Pizarro (disambiguation)